John Diamond, Baron Diamond, PC (30 April 1907 – 3 April 2004), known as Jack Diamond, was a British Labour Party politician.

Diamond was educated at Leeds Grammar School and became an accountant. He was elected Member of Parliament in 1945 for the Blackley division of Manchester, but lost it in 1951. In 1946 and 1947, he was parliamentary private secretary to the Ministry of Works. He returned to the House of Commons in a 1957 by-election for Gloucester, caused by the death of its Labour MP, Moss Turner-Samuels.

He served as Chief Secretary to the Treasury from 1964, a cabinet position from 1968, and Privy Councillor from 1965. He represented Gloucester until his surprise defeat in 1970 by the Conservative candidate, Sally Oppenheim-Barnes.

Diamond was appointed to the Privy Council in the 1965 Birthday Honours, and was created a life peer as Baron Diamond of the City of Gloucester on 25 September 1970. In 1981 he left the Labour Party for the new Social Democratic Party. He led the SDP in the House of Lords from 1982 to 1988 but opposed its merger with the Liberals and rejoined Labour in 1995.

Family
Diamond was first married in 1932 and had two sons and a daughter. He had a daughter, Joan, by his second wife, Julie Goodman, whom he married in 1948. They separated in 1966 and divorced 10 years later. Upon his death at 96, he was survived by his children and by his third wife, Barbara Kagan, whom he had married in 1976.

References

External links
 

1907 births
2004 deaths
People from Chalfont St Giles
Politicians from Leeds
Members of the Privy Council of the United Kingdom
Labour Party (UK) MPs for English constituencies
British Jews
People educated at Leeds Grammar School
Social Democratic Party (UK) life peers
UK MPs 1945–1950
UK MPs 1950–1951
UK MPs 1951–1955
UK MPs 1955–1959
UK MPs 1959–1964
UK MPs 1964–1966
UK MPs 1966–1970
UK MPs who were granted peerages
Labour Party (UK) life peers
Members of Parliament for Gloucester
Jewish British politicians
Members of the Fabian Society
Treasurers of the Fabian Society
Ministers in the Wilson governments, 1964–1970
Social Democratic Party (UK, 1988) peers
Life peers created by Elizabeth II
Chief Secretaries to the Treasury